The baywings are two species of birds in the genus Agelaioides, which were described in the early 19th century. These species are found in Brazil and in the case of A. badius, also Argentina, Bolivia, Uruguay, and Paraguay. They were formerly in included in genus Molothrus with cowbirds.

Species 

Taxa named by John Cassin